Bad Zwesten is a municipality in the Schwalm-Eder district of Hesse, Germany.

Geography

Location
Bad Zwesten lies about 8 km southeast of Bad Wildungen on the river Schwalm, which belongs to the Eder watershed. North of the community begins the Kellerwald-Edersee Nature Park.

Constituent communities
 Betzigerode
 Niederurff
 Oberurff-Schiffelborn
 Wenzigerode
 Zwesten (administrative seat)

History
Zwesten had its first documentary mention about the year 800. In 1913 came the discovery of a mineral spring, which in 1960 was officially declared a recognized Heilquelle (≈health spring).

Within the framework of municipal reform in Hesse, the formerly independent communities of Betzigerode, Niederurff, Oberurff-Schiffelborn, Wenzigerode and Zwesten were amalgamated into the new, united community of Zwesten in 1972. In 1992, the community was granted official recognition as a spa, allowing it to prefix the designation Bad – German for "bath" – to its name.

Politics

Municipal council

Municipal representation consists of 23 members.
CDU 6 seats
SPD 10 seats
Greens 3 seats
FWG (citizens' coalition) 2 seats
Bürgerliste (citizens' coalition) 2 seats
(as of municipal elections on 26 March 2006)

Economy

The spa of Bad Zwesten bases its burgeoning prosperity on its Löwensprudel ("Lion's Fizzy Water"). In this spa town, two clinics are to be found, Hardtwald Clinics I and II with about 650 beds.

Transport
Bad Zwesten lies at the crossroads of Federal Highways (Bundesstraßen) B 3 and B 485. About 5 km from the community is the Borken/Bad Zwesten interchange with Autobahn A 49 (Kassel – Fritzlar – Marburg).

The community belongs to the North Hesse Transport Network (Nordhessischer Verkehrsverbund) which, among other things, runs a hailed shared taxi to Borken railway station on the Main-Weser Railway.

Literature
Martin Opfer: Zwesten : Betzigerode, Niederurff, Oberurff, Schiffelborn und Wenzigerode ; Bilder und Texte erzählen, wie es damals war, Wartberg-Verlag, Gudensberg-Gleichen 1989,

References

External links

 Bad Zwesten

Spa towns in Germany
Schwalm-Eder-Kreis